Lokomotiv is a Bulgarian association football club based in Gorna Oryahovitsa, which currently competes in the Third League, the third level of Bulgarian football.

Established in 1932 as a sports association of the railway workers in the town, the football department of Lokomotiv have been playing at their current home ground, the Lokomotiv Stadium, since 1956. The club's main colours are black and white. Lokomotiv GO's longest spell in the top division was between 1987 and 1995. Lokomotiv's highest league finish in the top division is 8th, and was achieved three times during their 1989–90, 1990–91 and 1993–94 A Group campaigns.

History 
The club was established in 1932 as RSC - Railway Sports Club by the railway workers at the Gorna Oryahovitsa railway station, a major railway junction in northern Bulgaria. In 1944 RSC merged with SC Borislav and was later renamed to RSC Borislav. The team finally became known by their current name Lokomotiv in 1945. Lokomotiv's best performance in the Bulgarian Cup came in 1947, when they lost to eventual winners Levski Sofia in the semi-final, a feat, which they would achieve again in 1987, but again losing to cup holders Levski Sofia. 
In the 1962–63 season, they won the B Group title, earning promotion to the A Group for the first time in their history. In the following top-tier season, Lokomotiv endured a difficult 1963–64 campaign. The team eventually finished the season last and were relegated back to the B Group after a brief spell.

In the 1986–87 season, Lokomotiv ranked second in the B Group and won promotion to the A Group after a 23-year absence. They spent eight consecutive seasons in the top division before being relegated in 1995. During the 1990–91 A Group season, Lokomotiv's forward Ivaylo Yordanov finished as the leading goalscorer of the A Group with a total of 21 goals and was later transferred to Portuguese club Sporting Clube de Portugal.

After 21 years of absence from the top flight, in the 2015–16 B Group, Lokomotiv finished third in the final league table and was one of the clubs approved and promoted to the newly restructured Bulgarian First League, following the adoption of new licensing criteria by the Bulgarian Football Union. Lokomotiv experienced difficulty in its return to the Bulgarian elite, as the team spent the majority of the season fighting in the relegation zone. The team was eventually relegated after one season spent in the top flight. 

After four seasons in the Second League, Lokomotiv were then relegated to the Third League at the end of the 2020/2021 season.

Seasons

Season by season

League positions

Recent seasons

Honours

Domestic
 First League:
 8th place (3): 1989–90, 1990–91, 1993–94
 Second League:
  Winners (1): 1962–63
  Runners-up (2): 1954-55, 1986–87
 Bulgarian Cup:
 Semi-finals (2): 1947, 1987
 Quarter-finals (4): 1993, 1994, 2015, 2016

International
 Intertoto Cup:
 Group winner (1): 1992

European tournaments history

Current squad
As of 25 September 2020

For recent transfers, see Transfers winter 2020–21 and Transfers summer 2021.

Managers

Notable stats

External links
 Official website
 Bulgarian Clubs-Loko GO
 Intertoto Cup 1992
 Facebook Page
 Genchev turns on Loko GO
 Footballdatabase Profile
 Soccerway Profile

 
Lokomotiv Gorna Oryahovitsa
Lokomotiv Gorna Oryahovitsa
1932 establishments in Bulgaria
Gorna Oryahovitsa